The Democratic Republic of Yemen, colloquially known as South Yemen, was a breakaway state that fought against Yemen Arab Republic in the 1994 Yemeni Civil War. It was declared in May 1994 and covered all of the former South Yemen.

The DRY, with its capital in Aden, was led by President Ali Salim al-Beidh and Prime Minister Haidar Abu Bakr al-Attas and represented a response to the weakening position of the South in the civil war of 1994. The new state failed to receive international recognition, despite the sympathy of Saudi Arabia for its position. Its leaders, in addition to Yemeni Socialist Party figures such as al-Beidh and Attas, included some prominent personalities from South Yemeni history such as Abdallah al-Asnaj, who had been strenuously opposed to YSP one-party rule in the former People's Democratic Republic of Yemen.

The secession followed several weeks of fighting, which began on 27 April and lasted from 21 May 1994 until 7 July 1994. The civil war ended by the DRY strongholds of Mukalla and Aden falling to government forces.

See also
 History of Yemen
 South Yemen Movement

References

1994 establishments in Yemen
Yemen
Yemen
Yemen
Yemen
Yemen
Yemen
Yemen
Yemen